Rhagovelia is a genus of smaller water striders in the family Veliidae. There are at least 390 described species in Rhagovelia.

Evolution

Origins
The origins of the genus are among water striders of Veliidae family without propelling fans on their legs.

Evolution from water striders

Genes 'geisha' and 'mother-of-geisha'
The duplication of genes, called by researchers 'geisha' and 'mother-of-geisha', caused evolutionary creation of propelling fans on middle pair of water strider's legs which in its turn has made able for species in the genus to walk across more fast-flowing and turbulent streams.

See also
 List of Rhagovelia species

References

External links

Veliidae
Gerromorpha genera